is an Olympic and former World-Record-holding freestyle swimmer from Japan. She swam for Japan at the 2000 and 2004 Olympics.

Yamada was born in Osaka, Japan.

Major achievements
 2000 Olympics - 800 m freestyle 8th (8:37.39)
 2004 Olympics - 400 m freestyle 6th (4:10.91)

Personal bests
In long course
 400 m freestyle: 4:07.23
 800 m freestyle: 8:23.68 Asian Record

See also
World record progression 800 metres freestyle

References

 http://www.joc.or.jp/athens/athlete/swimming/yamadasachiko.html

External links
 Sachiko's Happy Diary

1982 births
Living people
Olympic swimmers of Japan
Kansai University alumni
Swimmers at the 2000 Summer Olympics
Swimmers at the 2004 Summer Olympics
Sportspeople from Osaka Prefecture
World record setters in swimming
Medalists at the FINA World Swimming Championships (25 m)
Asian Games medalists in swimming
Swimmers at the 1998 Asian Games
Swimmers at the 2002 Asian Games
Medalists at the 1998 Asian Games
Medalists at the 2002 Asian Games
Japanese female freestyle swimmers
Universiade medalists in swimming
Asian Games gold medalists for Japan
Asian Games silver medalists for Japan
Asian Games bronze medalists for Japan
Universiade gold medalists for Japan
Universiade bronze medalists for Japan
Medalists at the 2001 Summer Universiade